Hypsistarians, i.e. worshippers of the Hypsistos (the "Most High" God), and similar variations of the term first appear in the writings of Gregory of Nazianzus (Orat. xviii, 5) and Gregory of Nyssa (Contra Eunom. ii), about AD 374. The term has been linked to a body of inscriptions that date from around 100 AD to around 400 AD, mostly small votive offerings, but also including altars and stelae, dedicated to Theos Hypsistos, or sometimes simply Hypsistos, mainly found in Asia Minor (Cappadocia, Bithynia and Pontus) and the Black Sea coasts that are today part of Russia.

Some modern scholars identify the group, or groups, with God-fearers mentioned in the Acts of the Apostles, non-Jewish (gentile) sympathizers with Second Temple Judaism.

History
The name Hypsistarioi first occurs in Gregory of Nazianzus (Orat., xviii, 5) and the name Hypsistianoi in Gregory of Nyssa (Contra Eunom., II), about 374 CE. Gregory of Nazianzus describes a syncretic Jewish-pagan group that does not worship idols, reveres lamps and fire, and worships the Almighty (Pantokrator). They keep Sabbath and adhere to dietary restrictions, but they do not circumcise. Gregory of Nyssa adds that they refer to God as the Highest (Hypsistos) or Almighty (Pantokrator). Gregory of Nazianzus' description of this cult occurs in his eulogy for his father, who was a Hypsistarian before his conversion to Christianity. This cult may have formed as the native Cappadocian cult of Zeus Sabazios integrated with the cult of Jahve Sabaoth practiced by the numerous and intellectually predominant Jewish colonies, and that associations (sodalicia, thiasoi) of strict monotheists formed, who fraternized with the Jews, but who considered themselves free from the Law of Moses.

A late 3rd century CE shrine in a wall of the ancient city of Oenoanda provides the strongest archaeological evidence for this cult. It is adorned with an inscription adapting a declaration of the Apollonian oracle in Didyma, describing the god as, "Self-begotten, un-taught, un-mothered, undisturbed, not permitting a name, many-named, dwelling in fire." Another inscription below the first dedicates a lantern to the Most High God. In addition, a great number of votive tablets and other inscriptions are evidence that referring to one or more gods as Most High (Hypsistos, often as Theos Hypsistos 'god most high', or as Zeus or Attis, but frequently unnamed) was widespread throughout Anatolia (cf. Acts 16:17, "these men are servants of the most high God" — oracle of the Pythia at Philippi).

Contemporary Hellenistic use of hypsistos as a religious term appears to be derived from and compatible with the term as appears in the Septuagint, from a much earlier date. (Greek  (hypsistos) translates Hebrew  (elyon), meaning "highest". This term occurs more than fifty times as a substitution for the Tetragrammaton (the name of God) or in direct relation to God (most often in the Psalms, Daniel, and Sirach).

The existence of Hypsistarians may have contributed to the astounding swiftness of the spread of Christianity in Asia Minor; yet not all of them accepted the new faith, and small communities of monotheists, neither Christians nor Jews, continued to exist, especially in Cappadocia.

Persius (34-62) may have had Hypsistarians in view when he ridiculed such hybrid religionists in Satire v, 179–84, and Tertullian (c. 160 – c. 225 AD) seems to refer to them in Ad nationes, I, xiii. The claim that Hypsistarians continued to exist until the ninth century relies on a mistaken interpretation of Nicephorus Const., "Antirhet. adv. Const. Copr.", I, in Migne, PG, col. 209. Hypsistarians are probably referred to under the name Coelicoloe in a decree of the Emperors Honorius and Theodosius II (AD 408), in which their places of worship are transferred to the Christians.

Mention by Goethe
After describing his difficulties with mainstream religion, Goethe laments that

Sources
 
 .

References

Jews and Judaism in the Roman Empire
Ancient Mediterranean religions
Hellenism and Christianity
Hellenistic religion
Monotheistic religions